Al Kanaar (born 4 March 1983) is a former Australian Rugby union footballer.  Kanaar played as a Lock / Flanker for the New South Wales Waratahs. Kanaar made 26 appearances for NSW and was capped once for the Wallabies, against the All Blacks at Eden Park in 2005. He was forced to retire before the 2008 season started due to a chronic knee injury.
Al Kanaar is now the purple cap age group manager at Gerringong SLSC nippers.
Al finished in seventh place in the swim at the Gerringong SLSC club champs before a sixth-place finish in the Taplin Relay at the 2020 Branch Championships.

References

External links
NSW Waratahs Profile

1983 births
Living people
Australia international rugby union players
Australian rugby union players
Rugby union players from Nowra, New South Wales
Rugby union locks
Rugby union flankers